Sebastian Rieschick (born 15 February 1986 in Berlin) is a German tennis player. He has a career high-ranking of 199 (achieved on 15 August 2011). His coach is Peter Pfannkoch.

Junior Grand Slam finals

Doubles: 1 (1 runner-up)

ATP Challenger and ITF Futures finals

Singles: 15 (8–7)

Doubles: 22 (13–9)

External links
 
 

German male tennis players
Tennis players from Berlin
1986 births
Living people